Vynnyky is a city in Lviv Raion, Lviv Oblast (region) of Ukraine. It belongs to Lviv urban hromada, one of the hromadas of Ukraine. As of 2021, its population was estimated to be .

The city is part of Lychakiv Raion of the city of Lviv.

History
Since the mid-14th century, until the Partitions of Poland, Vynnyky, called in Polish Winniki, belonged to Ruthenian Voivodeship, Kingdom of Poland. From 1772 to 1918, it was part of Austrian Galicia, and in the interbellum period, the town returned to Poland, as part of Lwow Voivodeship. In 1925 the population of the city accounted for 6,000 residents out which 3,300 were Polish, 2,150 –
Ruthenians, 350 – Jewish, and 200 – Germans.

Until 18 July 2020, Vynnyky belonged to Lviv Municipality. The municipality was abolished in July 2020 as part of the administrative reform of Ukraine, which reduced the number of raions of Lviv Oblast to seven. The area of Lviv Municipality was merged into the newly established Lviv Raion.

Gallery

People from Vynnyky 
 Andreas Bolek (1894–1945); Austrian Nazi 
 Myron Markevych — Ukrainian football manager
 Antoni Laub – Polish painter
 Katrya Hrynevycheva – Ukrainian writer and community leader
 Robert Reyman – general of the Polish Army
 Jerzy Rosolowicz – Polish painter

International Relations

Twin towns – sister cities
Vynnyky is twinned with:
  Dębica, Poland
  Milovice, Czech Republic

References

External links

 Winniki (2.) (Vynnyky) in Geographical Dictionary of the Kingdom of Poland (1893)
 Jewish history of the town.

Cities in Lviv Oblast
Cities of district significance in Ukraine